In enzymology, a quinaldate 4-oxidoreductase is an enzyme that catalyzes the chemical reaction

quinaldate + acceptor + H2O  kynurenate + reduced acceptor

The 3 substrates of this enzyme are quinaldate, acceptor, and H2O, whereas its two products are kynurenate and reduced acceptor.

This enzyme belongs to the family of oxidoreductases, specifically those acting on the CH-CH group of donor with other acceptors.  The systematic name of this enzyme class is quinoline-2-carboxylate:acceptor 4-oxidoreductase (hydroxylating). This enzyme is also called quinaldic acid 4-oxidoreductase.

References

 
 

EC 1.3.99
Enzymes of unknown structure